Moses Taft House may refer to:

 Moses Taft House (Uxbridge, Massachusetts), listed on the National Register of Historic Places (NRHP)
 Moses Taft House (Burrillville, Rhode Island), NRHP-listed

See also
Taft House (disambiguation)